The Oracle C++ Call Interface (OCCI), as defined by the database company Oracle Corporation, offers C++ programmers a comfortable interface to access Oracle databases. The OCCI classes have parameters reminiscent of SQL statements. The interface has functioned since Oracle release 9i.

OCCI originated from the Oracle Call Interface (OCI), the interface used by C programmers.

See also 
 Oracle C++ Call Interface main page
 OCCI Developer Reference

Oracle software